Jaroslav Tuček (born 24 August 1882, date of death unknown) was a Bohemian fencer. He won a bronze medal in the team sabre event at the 1908 Summer Olympics.

He authored the book about the history of fencing Pražští šermíři a mistři šermu (Prague 1927).

References

1882 births
Year of death missing
Czech male fencers
Olympic fencers of Bohemia
Olympic fencers of Czechoslovakia
Fencers at the 1908 Summer Olympics
Fencers at the 1920 Summer Olympics
Olympic bronze medalists for Bohemia
Olympic medalists in fencing
Medalists at the 1908 Summer Olympics
Sportspeople from the Austro-Hungarian Empire